Too Much Wife is a lost 1922 American silent comedy film directed by Thomas N. Heffron, written by Percy Heath and Lorna Moon, and starring Wanda Hawley, T. Roy Barnes, Arthur Hoyt, Lillian Langdon, Leigh Wyant, Willard Louis, and Bertram Johns. It was released on January 1, 1922, by Paramount Pictures.

Plot
As described in a film magazine, Myra (Hawley) marries Jack Morgan (Barnes), a dealer in hides. He has a love-sick stenographer (Wyant) who is fond of holding hands. Myra overhears her sobbing as she talks to her husband, so she forthwith discharges her. She becomes Jack's assistant in everything from business to golf until he becomes bored. He sends himself a fake telegram so he can get away on a fishing trip, and while fishing his boat capsizes and he is reported lost. He swims to an island where he runs into his former stenographer. She uses "cave man" methods on him and calls him a "jellyfish." His wife and party arrive off shore to strew flowers on his watery grave and discover him on the island. A reconciliation follows and Jack and Myra escape on the motor boat, leaving her mother (Langdon) behind.

Cast
Wanda Hawley as Myra Morgan
T. Roy Barnes as Jack Morgan
Arthur Hoyt as John Coningsby
Lillian Langdon as Mrs. Coningsby
Leigh Wyant as Jane Cunningham
Willard Louis as Tom Hare
Bertram Johns as Jim Walker
Johnny Fox as Office Boy

References

External links

1922 films
1920s English-language films
Silent American comedy films
Paramount Pictures films
American black-and-white films
Films directed by Thomas N. Heffron
American silent feature films
Lost American films
1922 comedy films
1920s American films